Contracorriente (Countercurrent in English) is the debut solo album by Mexican singer and actress Eiza González. It was released on November 24, 2009, through EMI Televisa Music. The album was recorded in Los Angeles, California, Texas, and Mexico City during 2008 and early 2009.

Promotion

Singles
"Mi Destino Soy Yo" is the first and only single from Contracorriente. The song was produced by Rafael Esparza-Ruiz and Luigi Gonzalez.

Track listings

Chart performance

Charts

Release history

References 

Eiza González albums
2009 debut albums